Goran Mirović (Serbian Cyrillic: Горан Мировић; born 18 May 1982) is a Serbian footballer. He played as midfielder. He ended his career in 2017.

He also played at Premier League of Bosnia and Herzegovina club FK Rudar Prijedor, Macedonian First League clubs GFK Tikvesh and FK Pelister, First League of the Republika Srpska club FK Borac Šamac, Albanian Superliga club KS Apolonia Fier, and Serbian First League club OFK Mladenovac.

References
 Goran Mirović at Srbijafudbal
 Footballdatabase Profile

External links
 Goran Mirovic - MIX - 
 GORAN MIROVIC - 1st Part 
 GORAN MIROVIC - 2nd Part

1982 births
Living people
People from Smederevska Palanka
Serbian footballers
Serbian expatriate footballers
Association football midfielders
OFK Mladenovac players
FK Pelister players
Expatriate footballers in North Macedonia
KF Apolonia Fier players
Expatriate footballers in Albania
Serbian expatriate sportspeople in Albania
FK Rudar Prijedor players
FK Tikvesh players